The Diplomatic and Consular Premises Act 1987 is an Act of Parliament passed by the United Kingdom Parliament which allows the UK government to determine what land is considered to be diplomatic or consular premises.

The act was a result of a government review of the law related to the inviolability of diplomatic premises following the 1984 Libyan Embassy Siege.

The law has only been used once, for the Cambodian embassy in London, which had been occupied by squatters. The embassy had been used by the Government of Cambodia before it was overthrown by Pol Pot in 1975. While that government was recognised by Britain, no diplomatic mission was established before Cambodia was invaded by Vietnam in 1978, and the building came into the care of the British Foreign Office. The squatters moved in while the embassy was vacant in 1976, and in 1988 they would have gained title to the building following twelve years of continuous occupation. Hence an order was made, the Diplomatic and Consular Premises (Cambodia) Order 1988, to de-recognise the diplomatic premises so that legal action could be taken to remove the squatters.

In 2012 the UK government said it was considering using the law after Julian Assange, the founder of WikiLeaks, sought refuge in the Ecuadorian embassy in London, to avoid being extradited to Sweden where he faced allegations of sexual assault.

References

See also
 Vienna Convention on Diplomatic Relations

United Kingdom Acts of Parliament 1987
Foreign relations of the United Kingdom
Diplomatic missions in the United Kingdom